Pokvarena mašta i prljave strasti (trans. Perverted Imagination and Sordid Passions) is the second studio album from Serbian and former Yugoslav rock band Riblja Čorba, released in 1981.

In 1998, the album was polled as the 23rd on the list of 100 greatest Yugoslav rock and pop albums in the book YU 100: najbolji albumi jugoslovenske rok i pop muzike (YU 100: The Best albums of Yugoslav pop and rock music). In 2015, the album was pronounced the 13th on the list of 100 greatest Yugoslav albums published by Croatian edition of Rolling Stone.

Album cover
The album cover was designed by Jugoslav Vlahović.

The original album cover was supposed to display a photograph of naked Mrs. Adela, an eighty-year-old model at the Belgrade's University of Arts' Facility of Fine Arts. However, shortly before the album was released, Bijelo Dugme's Doživjeti stotu came out with a naked old woman on the three-piece cover, so the Pokvarena mašta i prljave strasti cover ended up featuring writer Miloš Jovančević reading a porn magazine.

Track listing

Personnel
Bora Đorđević - vocals, harmonica, acoustic guitar, percussion
Rajko Kojić - guitar
Momčilo Bajagić - guitar, backing vocals
Miša Aleksić - bass guitar, backing vocals
Vicko Milatović - drums

Additional personnel
Enco Lesić - piano, keyboard, producer
Dušan Vasiljević - recorded by
Miroslav Cvetković - recorded by

Reception

By the end of 1981, more than 200,000 copies were sold.

Legacy
In 1998, the album was polled as the 23rd on the list of 100 greatest Yugoslav rock and pop albums in the book YU 100: najbolji albumi jugoslovenske rok i pop muzike (YU 100: The Best albums of Yugoslav pop and rock music).

In 2015, the album was pronounced the 13th on the list of 100 greatest Yugoslav albums published by Croatian edition of Rolling Stone. The magazine wrote:

{{cquote|Passionate rock, with tense vocal chords, tons of sweat and emotions had its amount of "perverted imagination and sordid passions". Actually, there was nothing perverted and sordid in the songwriting of talented Bora Đorđević, who, in the songs of outstanding emotional realism, mentioned and accurately revealed the "dark sides" of life, the twosome, man-woman, and society in general. Brilliant, perspicacious lyrics about the life in a "big dirty city" [...] on Pokvarena mašta i prljave strasti resulted in one of the best albums of yu rock, expanding the thematic circle of Đorđević and Čorba from their superb debut, Kost u grlu. Huge commercial success - fueled primarily by exquisite songs which became the new standard - led to recording of following albums, Mrtva priroda and Buvlja pijaca, with foreign producer, but raw sound of Pokvarena mašta was the perfect outlet for Đorđević's songs, which, alongside the growing repertoire of Branimir Štulić, during those years swept away everything in their path and marked the establishing of a great new talent [...] Pokvarna mašta is the peak of neorealism of domestic rock, not new wave, but "black wave", some sort of equivalent to Žika Pavlović and the 1960s films of Serbian Black Wave.}}

In 2015 Pokvarena mašta i prljave strasti album cover was ranked 18th by web magazine Balkanrock on their list of 100 Greatest Album Covers of Yugoslav Rock.

Covers
Serbian pop punk band Lude Krawe released a cover of "Dva dinara druže" (alongside a cover of the song "Vetar duva, duva, duva" from Riblja Čorba's album Mrtva priroda) on their 2007 cover album Sve tuđe.

 References 

Pokvarena mašta i prljave strasti at Discogs
 EX YU ROCK enciklopedija 1960-2006,  Janjatović Petar;  
 Riblja čorba'',  Jakovljević Mirko;

External links 
Pokvarena mašta i prljave strasti at Discogs

Riblja Čorba albums
1981 albums
PGP-RTB albums
Heavy metal albums by Serbian artists